Bells Creek is a stream in the U.S. state of West Virginia.

Bells Creek was named for the fact Indians would ring cowbells in order to lure white settlers into a booby trap.

See also
List of rivers of West Virginia

References

Rivers of Fayette County, West Virginia
Rivers of Kanawha County, West Virginia
Rivers of Nicholas County, West Virginia
Rivers of West Virginia